Oskar Holtzmann (20 January 1859, Stuttgart – 10 March 1934, Giessen) was a German theologian who specialized in New Testament studies.

From 1877 to 1883 he studied theology at the universities of Strasbourg, Göttingen and Giessen and at the seminary in Friedberg. Afterwards, he served as a pastor in Bickenbach and as a teacher at a number of different schools. In 1889 he became a lecturer at the University of Giessen, where during the following year, he was appointed an associate professor of New Testament exegesis.

Published works 
In 1901 he issued Leben Jesu, a book that was later translated into English and published as The life of Jesus, translated by J.T. Bealby and Maurice A. Canney (London: Black, 1904). Holtzmann's other noted works include:
 Das Johannesevangelium, untersucht und erklärt, 1887 – The Gospel of John, investigated and explained.
 Geschichte des volkes Israel; 2 volumes, 1887–88 (with Bernhard Stade) – History of the people of Israel.
 Religionsgeschichtliche Vorträge, 1902 – Religious history lectures.
 War Jesus ekstatiker? : eine Untersuchung zum Leben Jesu, 1903 – Was Jesus ecstatic?  : A study on the life of Jesus.
 Der christliche Gottesglaube : seine Vorgeschichte und Urgeschichte, 1905 – The Christian belief in God: its history and prehistory.
 Neutestamentliche Zeitgeschichte, 1906 – New Testament history. 
 Der Tosephtatraktat Berakot; Text, Übersetzung und Erklärung, 1912 – The Tosephtatraktat Berakot; translation and explanation.

External links 
 Works available at German Digital Library

References 

1859 births
1934 deaths
19th-century German Protestant theologians
20th-century German Protestant theologians
Academic staff of the University of Giessen
Writers from Stuttgart